Evanildo Cavalcante Bechara is a Brazilian scholar. He was born in Recife  on February 26, 1928. He was orphaned at an early age, and moved to Rio de Janeiro in order to complete his education, staying at the home of a great uncle.

From an early age he showed a vocation for teaching, a vocation that led him to take the Neolatine Literature course at the Faculty of Instituto La-Fayette, today UERJ. He obtained his bachelor's degree in 1948 and Licensed in 1949.

At fifteen he met Professor Manuel Said Ali, a prolific scholar of the Portuguese language who was in his 80s. The experience persuaded Evanildo Bechara to dedicate himself to linguistic studies. At seventeen, he writes his first essay, entitled Fenômenos de Intonação, published in 1948, with a preface by Minas Gerais philologist Lindolfo Gomes.

After completing his university education, he studied Romanesque Philology with Dámaso Alonso in Madrid, in 1961–1962, under a scholarship offered by the Spanish Government. He obtained a Doctor of Letters at UEG (now UERJ), in 1964.

He was invited by Professor Antenor Nascentes to be his assistant at the Faculty of Philosophy, Sciences and Letters of UEG (now UERJ) in 1964. He was professor of Roman Philology at the Institute of Letters at UERJ, from 1962 to 1992. He was professor of Portuguese Language at UFF Institute of Letters, from 1976 to 1994. He was full professor of Portuguese Language, Linguistics and Romance Philology at the Souza Marques Technical-Educational Foundation, from 1968 to 1988. In 1971-72 he held the position of Visiting Titular Professor at the University of Cologne (Germany) and from 1987 to 1989 the same position at the University of Coimbra (Portugal).

He became Professor Emeritus at the State University of Rio de Janeiro (1994) and at the Federal Fluminense University (1998).

Among his university theses are the following titles: The Granting Thought Evolution in Portuguese (1954), The Future in Romanesque (1962), The Syntax Nominal in Peregrinatio ad Loca Sancta Aetheriae (1964), The Contribution of M . Said Ali for Portuguese Philology (1964), The Studies on The Lusíadas by José Maria Rodrigues (1980), The Historical Phases of the Portuguese Language: Attempted Proposal for a New Periodization (1985). He is the author of two dozen books, including the Modern Portuguese Grammar, widely used in schools and academic circles. He was director of the team of students of Literature at PUC-RJ who, in 1972, raised the lexical corpus of the Portuguese Language Vocabulary, under the general direction of Antônio Houaiss.

He was Director of the Philosophy and Letters Institute at UERJ, from 1974 to 1980 and from 1984 to 1988; Secretary-General of the State Education Council of Rio de Janeiro, from 1965 to 1975; Director of the Education Institute of Rio de Janeiro, from 1976 to 1977; Member of the Rio de Janeiro State Education Council, from 1978 to 1984; Head of the Philology and Linguistics Department at the Institute of Philosophy and Letters at UERJ, from 1981 to 1984; Head of the Department of Letters of the Fundação Técnico-Educacional Souza Marques, from 1968 to 1988.

Full member of the Brazilian Academy of Philology, of the Brazilian Society of Romanists, of the Language Circle of Rio de Janeiro. Member of Société de Linguistique Romane (of which he was a member of the Scientifique Committee, for the 1996-1999 quadrennium) and of the PEN Club do Brasil. Corresponding member of the Lisbon Science Academy and the International Academy of Portuguese Culture.

He was awarded the title of Doctor Honoris Causa from the University of Coimbra (2000). He was given the José de Anchieta and Honor of Educational Merit medals (from the Rio de Janeiro Department of Education and Culture), and Oskar Nobiling medal (from the Brazilian Society of Language and Literature).

He was invited by academic friends to apply to the Brazilian Academy of Letters, after the vacancy left by Afrânio Coutinho, based on the argument that the institution needed a philologist and expert in the Portuguese language. He was the fifth occupant of Chair 33, to which he was elected on December 11, 2000, and he was received on May 25, 2001 by Academician Sergio Corrêa da Costa. He was Treasury Director of the Institution (2002-2003) and Secretary-General (2004-2005). He created the Antônio de Morais Silva Collection, to publish Portuguese language studies, and is a member of the Committee on Lexicology and Lexicography and the Selection Committee of the Rodolfo Garcia Library.

Among hundreds of articles, communications to national and international congresses, Bechara wrote books that have already become classics, due to their successive editions. He was the Director of Littera magazine (1971-1976) - 16 volumes published; Confluência magazine (1990-2005) - 30 published volumes.

He was elected by a collegiate of educators in Rio de Janeiro, with the support of Folha Dirigida, one of the ten educational personalities of 2004 and 2005. At the invitation of Nova Fronteira he is a member of the Editorial Board of the various volumes of the Caldas Aulete Dictionary.

In 2005 he was appointed a member of the State Reading Council of Rio de Janeiro and of the Commission for the Definition of Teaching, Learning, Research and Promotion of the Portuguese Language Policy, an initiative of the Ministry of Education.

In 2008, as a tribute to his 80 years, a miscellany entitled "Interlaces between texts" was organized by Professor Doctor Ricardo Cavaliere. This tribute was edited and published by Nova Fronteira. Still in 2008, Nova Fronteira also launched “80 years Homenagem: Evanildo Bechara”, a work that addresses the trajectory of the teacher, grammarian and writer through the observation of colleagues, students, friends and admirers. It was organized by Dieli Vesaro Palma, Maria Mercedes Saraiva and others.

References

Brazilian philologists